Andrea Lawrence may refer to:

 Andrea Lawrence (professor) (born 1946), American computer scientist and professor
 Andrea Mead Lawrence (1932–2009), American skier
 Andria Lawrence (born 1936), English actress and writer (a.k.a. Andrea Lawrence)